Enneapterygius melanospilus is a species of triplefin blenny in the genus Enneapterygius. It was described by John E. Randall in 1995. It is found in the Arabian Sea off Oman.

References

melanospilus
Fish described in 1995